The HSL 1 is a high-speed rail line which connects Brussels, Belgium, with the LGV Nord at the Belgium–France border. Service began on 14 December 1997.

The line has appreciably shortened journey times, the journey from Paris to Brussels now taking 1 hour 22 minutes. In combination with the LGV Nord, it has also impacted international journeys to other cities in France and to London, ensuring high-speed through-running by Eurostar, TGV, Thalys PBA and Thalys PBKA trainsets.

The total construction cost was €1.42 billion. The signalling system installed is the TVM-430 in-cab signalling system, the same as LGV Nord in France, and High Speed 1 in the UK.

Route
Trains leave Brussels-Midi station via a new viaduct completed in 2006 to separate high-speed services from local services. From there they use the conventional line 96. At Forest/Vorst the train passes the depot where inspections of Thalys and Eurostar trains may be carried out. At Halle (km 13) the HST tracks split from the mainline and enters its own cut-and-cover section before crossing the Brussels–Charleroi Canal; at km 17 the high-speed line proper diverges from the mainline at the Lembeek Viaduct, supporting  speeds.

Between Rebecq and Enghien the line parallels the A8 autoroute, separated by a security fence.

The maintenance depot "Le Coucou" is located near Ath. This station served as the operations base during the construction of the line (from 1993 to 1998) and currently serves as the maintenance depot for HSL 1.

At Antoing there is a connector to the Mons–Tournai line, used by the Thalys between Paris and Namur. After passing over the  Scheldt River Viaduct, and through the  Bruyelle cut-and-cover section, the line crosses the Belgian-French border at Wannehain, km 88.  further on, the Frétin triangle splits the LGV Nord towards Paris or Lille.

See also
 High-speed rail in Belgium

Notes

External links
Belgian high-speed rail site (in French)

TGV
Eurostar
High-speed railway lines in Belgium
Railway lines opened in 1997
Standard gauge railways in Belgium